JXN may refer to:
 Jackson County Airport (Michigan)
 Jackson station (Michigan)
 Noviken VLF Transmitter, a NATO transmitter in Norway
 JXN (musician), an Australian musician